Air Marshal Sir Barry Michael Thornton,  is a British retired officer who was a senior commander in the Royal Air Force.

Personal life
Thornton was educated at Baines Grammar School and the University of Nottingham.

He is married to Delia Thornton, a trained midwife and family law barrister. The couple has two sons, Oliver and William.

Military career
Thornton joined the Royal Air Force in 1976. He was given command of the Engineering and Supply Wing at RAF Honington in 1988 and subsequently deployed to Tabuk Air Base during the Gulf War. In 1991 he took command of the RAF's nuclear weapon inspection team. Then in 1997 he joined the Defence Procurement Agency as the Director of Maritime Projects with responsibility for the Merlin and Nimrod programmes. In 2000 he became Controller of Aircraft on the Air Force Board and in 2003 he was made Director General Equipment Support (Air) and then Director General Logistics (Strike) at the Defence Logistics Organisation. He became the last Commander in Chief Personnel and Training Command in January 2006 serving until April 2007 when the command was merged into Air Command: he then took up the post of Chief of Defence Material (Air) at Defence Equipment & Support. He retired in May 2009.

References

|-
 
 

|-
 

|-

Year of birth missing (living people)
Royal Air Force air marshals
Fellows of the Royal Aeronautical Society
Knights Commander of the Order of the Bath
Living people
Alumni of the University of Nottingham